"Errbody" is a song by American rapper Lil Baby, released together with another song, "On Me", on December 4, 2020, a day after his 26th birthday. The song was produced by Section 8 and peaked at number 41 on the Billboard Hot 100.

Background and composition
"Errbody" was announced by Lil Baby on his birthday, and is the first of the two songs to hit streaming services. Sophie Caraan of Hypebeast called the song a "braggadocios and hard-hitting cut". In it, Lil Baby uses a "fast, twisty singsong flow over an eerie, low-key beat", and boasts his wealth and status in the rap game.

Music video
The music video was released alongside the single. Directed by Edgar Estevez, Daps and Christian Breslauer, the video finds Lil Baby in a car fleeing from an enemy firing gunshots at him. Baby and his associates also ride in helicopters around his neighborhood, on a deadly mission to take out his enemies.

Charts

References

2020 singles
2020 songs
Lil Baby songs
Songs written by Lil Baby
Songs written by Section 8 (record producer)
Song recordings produced by Section 8 (record producer)
Motown singles